Przygoda z piosenką (Pol. Adventure with song) is a Polish film musical comedy from 1969 directed by Stanisław Bareja.

Cast
 Bohdan Łazuka – Piotr
 Zdzisław Maklakiewicz – Drybek
 Pola Raksa – Mariola Brońska
 Barbara Krafftówna – madame Michaud
 Czesław Wołłejko – impresario Cox
 Urszula Modrzyńska – Cox' girl
 Irena Szewczyk – Cox' girl
 Ryszard Nawrocki – composer Waldemar
 Irena Santor – Suzanne Blanche AKA Zuzanna Białko
 Maciej Grzybowski – Michel
 Gerard Wilk – dancer

External links

1969 films
Films directed by Stanisław Bareja
1960s Polish-language films
1969 musical comedy films
Polish musical comedy films